Pet travel is the process of traveling with or transporting pets. Pet carriers like cat carriers and dog crates confine and protect pets during travel.

Animal stress

Pets may experience stress and anxiety from unfamiliar situations and locations. Cats are especially stressed by change. Instead of travelling with their owner on vacation, pets can be boarded at kennels or kept at home with a friend or pet sitter. However, that also includes unfamiliar situations and locations. This is not an option when moving permanently.

Travel methods

Air travel

Pets may travel in the aircraft cabin, checked baggage or cargo. However, airlines set their own policies regarding the travel of pets. Pet Airways specialized in transporting pets, but failed as a business. In recent years private-jet pet travel gained some momentum especially due to the discounted flight sales. In such travels pets are allowed in cabin with their owners which reduces stress and trauma. However, unlike flying commercial airline where ticket fee are paid one-off up-front, pet owners need to take precautions of extra cost involved in private jet flight with pets onboard, such as cleaning fee and de-icing fee of private jet. These cost may only be known  post flights.

The Humane Society of the United States recommends avoiding air travel if possible. Extreme temperatures and thin air have extra risk for brachycephalic animals such as bulldogs, Pekingese dogs, pugs and Persian cats. The United States Department of Transportation Air Travel Reports recorded 302 deaths, injuries and disappearances over 6 years with 35 deaths in 2011. At least two dogs died on United Airlines flights in 2012.

If pets escape, they can face danger, even if they escape on the ground. A cat named Jack escaped from his carrier in American Airlines baggage handling at John F. Kennedy Airport, went missing for 61 days, and was eventually euthanized. Another cat escaped and was run over by a vehicle on the tarmac at Indira Gandhi International Airport in Delhi, India when traveling with Jet Airways.

Controversy

In 2018, United Airlines admitted to forcing a passenger pet to be stowed away in an overhead bin, resulting in the animal's death. Only two days later, another dog aboard a United flight was mistakenly sent to Japan instead of its intended Kansas City destination.
A similar incident occurred in March 2018 when Delta Air Lines sent a puppy to Salt Lake City instead of its intended Boise destination.

Car travel
Pets riding in cars are safest contained in carriers tied with a seat belt. They are advised to be in the back seat or have the airbags turned off. Dog harnesses can restrain but the Center for Pet Safety found "a 100 percent failure rate to protect either the consumer or the dog". Unrestrained pets can interfere with driving and can be seriously injured in an accident, but no states require pets to be secured in cars.

Pet Strollers
Smaller domestic animals can be ambulated locally in a pet stroller pushed or pulled by a human; this may be especially useful for ill, lame, and elderly creatures. A pet stroller is similar in design to a baby stroller. The stroller may be enclosed with netting to prevent escape while allowing the pet to view, hear, and smell the ambient environment. Unlike a human infant, the animal is not immobilized in the stroller, but is free to move about within it.

Import, export and quarantine regulations

China (mainland)

According to the General Administration of Customs of China, since 2019, each passport holder is allowed to import into mainland China, 1 pet cat or 1 pet dog per passport holder without any requirements to applying for permits. Provided that the pet cat or pet dog has a ISO 11784/11785 microchip implant and has a rabies vaccination certificate and negative rabies titer test result from list of approved laboratories, and a veterinary certificate (attained within 14 days before arrival), all obtained no less than 30 days prior to arrival into mainland China, such pets may avoid 30 days' quarantine.

Pets without microchip or such documents missing may have to enter mainland China through designated ports only and go through a mandatory 30-day quarantine. List of designated ports: 
 Beijing Capital International Airport
 Beijing Daxing International Airport
 Beijing West railway station
 Shanghai Hongqiao International Airport
 Shanghai Pudong International Airport
 Shanghai railway station
 Shanghai International Passenger Transport Center
 Wusongkou International Cruise Terminal (Lujiazui)
 Ürümqi Diwopu International Airport
 Alashankou Port
 Guangzhou Baiyun International Airport

Hong Kong SAR

According to the Agriculture, Fisheries and Conservation Department, import of cats and dogs from the following countries/territories—Category I & II, are required "Special/Import permits" but are/may be exempt from 4 months' mandatory quarantine:
 Australia, Fiji, Hawaii, Ireland, Japan, New Zealand, United Kingdom, Bailiwick of Jersey, Austria, BahrainBermuda, Canada, Cyprus, Finland, Germany,Guam, Italy, Luxembourg, Malta, Norway, Papua New Guinea, Seychelles, Solomon Islands, Spain, Switzerland, Taiwan, Vanuatu, Bahamas, Belgium, Brunei, Cayman Island, Denmark, France, Gibraltar, Iceland, Jamaica, Maldives, Mauritius, New Caledonia, Portugal, Singapore, South Africa, Sweden, The Netherlands, USA (Continental), Virgin Islands.

Pet cats and dogs from other countries/territories—Category III, will have to apply for a "Special/Import permit" and go through mandatory 4 months quarantine upon arrival at Hong Kong, at the owner's expense, provided with proof of dogs being vaccinated against Canine distemper, Infectious canine hepatitis and Canine parvovirus and cats being vaccinated against the Feline panleucopaenia virus and Feline respiratory disease complex not less than 14 days before and not more than 1 year before importation into Hong Kong.

All pets entering the Hong Kong SAR must enter as manifested cargo only (except for land border crossing) and must be AVID or ISO 11784/11785 microchip implanted and carry a veterinary certificate (attained with 14 days of import). Pets may exit the Hong Kong SAR in the cabin with the owner or as checked baggage. Proof of rabies vaccination is generally not required by the Agriculture, Fisheries and Conservation Department for importation of pet cats and dogs into the Hong Kong SAR.

Pet animals transiting through Hong Kong also requires a "transit permit".

United Kingdom

A correctly prepared cat, dog, or ferret may be imported without quarantine into the United Kingdom from the following countries under the pet passport scheme, but only on an authorised transport company (which includes the Channel Tunnel & most ferry services for arrivals by car):

Countries issuing Pet Passports recognized by the UK: All EU countries, plus Andorra, Azores & Madeira, Canary Islands, Gibraltar, Greenland and the Faroe Islands, Iceland, Liechtenstein, Monaco, Norway, San Marino, Switzerland and the Vatican.

Countries listed by the UK for this purpose: Antigua and Barbuda, Argentina, Aruba, Ascension Island, Australia, Barbados, Bahrain, Belarus, Bermuda, BES Islands (Bonair, Saint Eustatius and Saba), Bosnia & Herzegovina, Canada, Cayman Islands, Chile, Curaçao, Falkland Islands, Fiji, French Polynesia, Guadeloupe, Hong Kong, Jamaica, Japan, Malaysia, Réunion, Martinique, Mauritius, Mayotte, Mexico, Montserrat, New Caledonia, New Zealand, North Macedonia, Russian Federation, Saint Maarten, St. Helena, St. Kitts & Nevis, St Pierre and Miquelon, Saint Vincent and the Grenadines, Singapore, Taiwan. Trinidad and Tobago, United Arab Emirates, USA (includes American Samoa, Guam, Northern Mariana Islands, Puerto Rico and the US Virgin Islands), Vanuatu, Wallis and Futuna.

See also
 Pet carrier
 Pet passport
 Pet sitting
 Pet taxi
 Transportation of animals

References

Pets
Types of travel